Gundaroo Airport  is a private airstrip located approximately  south of the village of Gundaroo in the Southern Tablelands region of New South Wales, Australia. The airport is on the grounds of "Bowylie Homestead", once the home of American actress Maud Jeffries and now the country estate of high-profile Australian aviator and entrepreneur Dick Smith. The airfield is home to the Bowylie Flying Club, a museum collection of aviation memorabilia and amateur radio equipment. The airside facilities are linked to the private homestead by a miniature railway which intersects the taxiway, requiring aircraft to give way to trains. The airfield may be available to the public by prior arrangement and has been a destination for aero clubs. The airfield has hosted a bi-annual rally for large scale model aircraft. This event attracts participants from clubs across Australia.

See also
List of airports in New South Wales

References

Airports in New South Wales